Giaginskaya (Džədžə) is a rural locality (a stanitsa) and the administrative center of Giaginsky District of the Republic of Adygea, Russia, located  from Maykop.  Population:  Giaginskaya is the most populous administrative center of a district in the republic, with its population accounting for 44.5% of the total population of Giaginsky District.

There are a railway station and a museum of local history in the stanitsa.

References

External links
Civil War history of Giaginskaya 
Official website of P. P. Tynchenko Museum of Local History of Giaginskaya 

Rural localities in Giaginsky District
1862 establishments in the Russian Empire
Populated places established in 1862